Via Funchal, with an area of 15,000 m2, was an arena in São Paulo, Brazil, that hosted many events, such as concerts and other shows before closing in December 2012.Seated, it hosted 3,120 people and standing, it hosted as many as 6,000 people.

Artists that have performed at Via Funchal include

External links
Via Funchal 

Music venues in São Paulo